Gretta Ray (born May 22nd 1998) is an Australian singer-songwriter from Melbourne, Victoria.

In 2016, she was the winner of the national Triple J Unearthed radio competition for bands and songwriters, and the 2016 Vanda & Young Global Songwriting Competition, with her song "Drive".

Early life and education
Gretta Ray grew up in Melbourne, Australia, attending Princes Hill Secondary College. She sang in choirs from the age of five, latterly singing and touring with Young Voices of Melbourne, and as the youngest member of If You See Her, Say Hello, a group of 21 Melbourne-based singer-songwriters.

Career

2016-2020: Career beginnings, Elsewhere and Here and Now

In February 2016, Ray released her debut EP, Elsewhere.

In August 2016, she won the national competition for emerging new artists called Triple J Unearthed High, for her song "Drive", which was produced by Nashville-based Australian music producer Josh Barber with Jonathan Dreyfus, recorded by Nick Edin and Fraser Montgomerey and mixed by US producer Ryan Hewit. The song received high-rotation airplay on Triple J. The announcement was made by Triple J presenters Matt and Alex, who snuck into a school concert while she was performing. Unearthed music director, Dave Ruby Howe called her a "...bold and exciting new talent who seems to win over everyone that comes into orbit of her music". Ray also a nomination for a J Award for Unearthed Artist of the Year at the 2016 J Awards.

On 27 October 2016, Ray won the 2016 edition of the Vanda & Young Global Songwriting Competition, which carries the largest first prize for any songwriting competition in the world.

In August 2018, Ray released her second EP titled Here and Now.

In September 2019, Ray released a cover of Bon Iver's "re: Stacks" with Dustin Tebbutt and in December 2019, "Heal You in Time".

2020–present: Begin to Look Around

On 20 May 2021, Ray announced her debut album Begin to Look Around, which was released on 27 August 2021. The album debuted at number 13 on the ARIA Charts. In April 2022, Ray announced the Begin To Look Around album tour, which is scheduled to occur in June 2022.

Discography

Studio albums

Extended plays

Singles

As lead artist

As featured artist

Awards and nominations

APRA Awards
The APRA Awards are held in Australia and New Zealand by the Australasian Performing Right Association to recognise songwriting skills, sales and airplay performance by its members annually. Ray has been nominated for one award.

! 
|-
! scope="row"| 2020
| "Radio Silence"
| Most Performed Alternate Work of the Year
| 
| 
|}

ARIA Music Awards
The ARIA Music Awards is an annual ceremony presented by Australian Recording Industry Association (ARIA), which recognise excellence, innovation, and achievement across all genres of the music of Australia. They commenced in 1987.

! 
|-
| 2021|| Begin to Look Around || Breakthrough Artist || 
| rowspan="8"| 
|-

J Award
The J Awards are an annual series of Australian music awards that were established by the Australian Broadcasting Corporation's youth-focused radio station Triple J. They commenced in 2005.

! 
|-
! scope="row"| 2016
| Gretta Ray
| Unearthed Artist of the Year
| 
| 
|-
! scope="row"| 2021
| Begin to Look Around
| Australian Album of the Year
| 
| 
|}

National Live Music Awards
The National Live Music Awards (NLMAs) are a broad recognition of Australia's diverse live industry, celebrating the success of the Australian live scene. The awards commenced in 2016.

! 
|-
! scope="row"| 2017
| Herself
| Live Blues and Roots Act of the Year
| 
| 
|}

Vanda & Young Global Songwriting Competition
The Vanda & Young Global Songwriting Competition is an annual competition that "acknowledges great songwriting whilst supporting and raising money for Nordoff-Robbins" and is coordinated by Albert Music and APRA AMCOS. It commenced in 2009.

! 
|-
! scope="row"| 2016
| "Drive"
| Vanda & Young Global Songwriting Competition
| style="background:gold;"| 1st
| 
|}

References

External links
 

1998 births
Living people
21st-century Australian singers
21st-century Australian women singers
Australian women pop singers
Australian women singer-songwriters
Australian singer-songwriters
Date of birth missing (living people)
Singers from Melbourne